General elections were held in Nicaragua on 6 October 1916 to elect a President, half of the Deputies and one-third of the Senators of National Congress of Nicaragua.

Although the United States offered to assist President Adolfo Díaz to hold free elections in 1916, this offer was rejected. A verbal promise was obtained from President Adolfo Díaz, however, that the elections would be free.
On 15 January 1916 the Secretary of State, Robert Lansing, had told the Conservative candidate Emiliano Chamorro Vargas that 'the United States would view his candidacy with great pleasure'.

The liberals boycotted the 1916 election, and conservative Emiliano Chamorro Vargas was elected with no opposition.

Results

President

References

Bibliography
 Elections in the Americas A Data Handbook Volume 1. North America, Central America, and the Caribbean. Edited by Dieter Nohlen. 2005.
 Kamman, William. A search for stability: United States diplomacy toward Nicaragua 1925–1933. Notre Dame: University of Notre Dame Press. 1968.
 MacRenato, Ternot. Somoza: seizure of power, 1926–1939. La Jolla: University of California, San Diego. 1991.
 Merrill, Tim L., Nicaragua : a country study. Washington: Federal Research Division, Library of Congress. 1994.
 Munro, Dana G. The United States and the Caribbean republics, 1921–1933. Princeton: Princeton University Press. 1974.
 Smith, Hazel. Nicaragua: self-determination and survival. London : Pluto Press. 1993.
 Schooley, Helen. Conflict in Central America. Harlow: Longman. 1987.
 United States . Department of State. The United States and Nicaragua: a survey of the relations from 1909 to 1932. Washington, D.C.: Government Printing Office. 1932.
 Vargas, Oscar-René. Elecciones presidenciales en Nicaragua, 1912–1932: análisis socio-político. Managua: Fundación Manolo Morales. 1989.

Elections in Nicaragua
1916 in Nicaragua
Nicaragua
Presidential elections in Nicaragua
October 1916 events
Election and referendum articles with incomplete results